Frank Odoi may refer to:
 Frank Odoi (footballer)
 Frank Odoi (cartoonist)